The South River Public Schools are a comprehensive community public school district that serves students in pre-kindergarten through twelfth grade from South River, in Middlesex County, New Jersey, United States.

As of the 2020–21 school year, the district, comprised of four schools, had an enrollment of 2,325 students and 203.0 classroom teachers (on an FTE basis), for a student–teacher ratio of 11.5:1.

The district is classified by the New Jersey Department of Education as being in District Factor Group "CD", the sixth-highest of eight groupings. District Factor Groups organize districts statewide to allow comparison by common socioeconomic characteristics of the local districts. From lowest socioeconomic status to highest, the categories are A, B, CD, DE, FG, GH, I and J.

Schools
Schools in the district (with 2020–21 enrollment data from the National Center for Education Statistics) are:
Elementary schools
South River Primary School with 399 students in grades PreK-1
Kevin W. Kidney, Principal
South River Elementary School with 655 students in grades 2-5
Lisa Wargo, Principal
Middle school 
South River Middle School with 511 students in grades 6-8
Tom Rizk, Principal
High school 
South River High School with 722 students in grades 9-12
Edward Bucior, Principal

Administration
Core members of the district's administration are:
Sylvia Zircher, Superintendent of Schools
Kenneth J. Kokoszka, Board Secretary / Business Administrator

Board of education
The district's board of education is comprised of nine members who set policy and oversee the fiscal and educational operation of the district through its administration. As a Type II school district, the board's trustees are elected directly by voters to serve three-year terms of office on a staggered basis, with three seats up for election each year held (since 2012) as part of the November general election. The board appoints a superintendent to oversee the district's day-to-day operations and a business administrator to supervise the business functions of the district.

References

External links
South River Public Schools
 
School Data for the South River Public Schools, National Center for Education Statistics

South River, New Jersey
New Jersey District Factor Group CD
School districts in Middlesex County, New Jersey